Nikep (originally known as Pekin) is an unincorporated community and census-designated place (CDP) in Allegany County, Maryland, United States. As of the 2020 census it had a population of 95.
Nikep is located in the Georges Creek Valley of western Allegany County, along the old route of Maryland Route 36.

The name Nikep was given to the first post office established in the community, because Pekin was already in use at another post office (Pekin, Indiana).

Demographics

References

Census-designated places in Allegany County, Maryland
Census-designated places in Maryland